Nusret Gökçe (born 1983), nicknamed Salt Bae, is a Turkish butcher, chef, food entertainer and restaurateur whose technique for preparing and seasoning meat became an Internet meme in January 2017.

He owns Nusr-Et, a chain of luxury steak houses. , he has Nusr-Et branches in Turkey, Greece, the United States, the United Kingdom, the United Arab Emirates, Qatar, and Saudi Arabia. The name of his restaurant chain comes from his own name and "Et", which means "meat" in Turkish.

Early life 
Nusret Gökçe was born in Paşalı, a village in Şenkaya district of Erzurum Province, to a Kurdish family. His father, Faik, was a mineworker. The family's finances forced him to leave school in the sixth grade (aged 11–12) to work as a butcher's apprentice in the Kadıköy district of Istanbul.

Career

Gökçe visited several countries including Argentina and the United States between 2007 and 2010, where he worked in local restaurants for free, in order to gain experience as a cook and a restaurateur. After his return to Turkey, Gökçe opened his first restaurant in Istanbul in 2010, and later opened a Dubai restaurant in 2014.

In January 2017 he became more widely known as Salt Bae through a series of viral Internet videos and memes that show him "suavely" cutting meat and sprinkling salt, such as "Ottoman Steak", posted on his restaurant's Twitter account. The post was viewed 10 million times on Instagram, after which he was dubbed "Salt Bae" due to his peculiar way of sprinkling salt: dropping it from his fingertips to his forearm, and then onto the dish. Due to the viral exposure gained from this post, Gökçe's profile has expanded enormously and he has served a wide range of celebrities and politicians from around the world.

Critical reception
Despite the international fame, early professional reviews in 2018 of his New York City steakhouse were generally negative. The New York Posts Steve Cuozzo called the restaurant "Public Rip-off No. 1" and Joshua David Stein writing in GQ called the steak mundane and the hamburgers overcooked. Other critics described the dishes as "over-salted as they are overpriced", the "meat was tough with globs of fat and gristle, and severely lacking in flavor", and that "finishing a meal there constitutes some kind of personal victory over your own body and instincts and mouth". Reviewers described the dining experience as "overpriced".

However, for entertainment, reviewers were more positive. Eaters Robert Sietsema states, "If you are intent on judging New York's new branch of Nusr-Et only as a steakhouse, you'll probably be disappointed ... If, on the other hand, you appraise the place as dinner theater, you will find it satisfying—but only if Salt Bae is in the house".

Controversies
In December 2017, Gökçe was criticized for a photo taken in 2016 – in which he posed in front of, and mimicked, a photo of former President Fidel Castro of Cuba. In September 2018, Czech internet personality Týnuš Třešničková became a victim of a failed fire show in the Nusr-Et steakhouse in Istanbul, resulting in 35% total body surface area burns. Several other guests also faced less serious body burns. That same month, Gökçe was criticized by U.S. Senator Marco Rubio and the Miami city council after President Nicolás Maduro of Venezuela had a meal at his restaurant in Istanbul.

In November 2019, four of Gökçe's former employees accused him of getting a share of their tips. They alleged that they were fired from his New York restaurant when they tried to ask questions about the tips. A trial was set to take place to investigate the issue, until Gökçe reached a settlement with his former employees and paid them $230,000. Explaining why he had fired them, he said: "I was not satisfied with the performance of the four employees... Since they were fired, they acted with the feeling of 'look what we are going to do to you' and put forward these tip allegations."

In late September 2020, his restaurant in Boston was ordered to close by public health officials several days after it opened due to violations of COVID-19 safety standards. It reopened in early October 2020. In October 2021, Gökçe came under scrutiny from the British media over a £37,000 bill for a meal at one of his UK restaurants.

In December 2022, after the 2022 FIFA World Cup Final between Argentina and France, Gökçe was again the focus of online criticism after joining the Argentine players on the field post-match, disturbing the players, biting their medals, and even handling the trophy, a gesture reserved for winners and heads of state. As a result, FIFA launched an investigation into Gökçe's actions during the final.

Personal life
Gökçe has been involved with charitable work, such as building a school in his hometown of Erzurum. According to a social media post shared on Instagram by Gökçe he had built a library, a guest house, a mosque, an English education center and a computer laboratory in his hometown.

References

External links 

It’s All About the Elbow story by Nimrod Kamer, October 2, 2021 Air Mail (magazine)

1983 births
Living people
 People from Erzurum
Turkish chefs
Turkish Kurdish people
Internet memes introduced in 2017
Turkish expatriates in the United Arab Emirates
2022 in Internet culture
Turkish restaurateurs